A Podyachy or podyachiy (from the Greek hypodiakonos, "assistant servant") was an office (bureaucratic) occupation in prikazes (local and upper governmental offices) and lesser local offices of Russia in 15th-18th centuries.

As an anachronism, it may be loosely translated as clerk the Latin word equally derived from a clerical title, and generically used.

Podyachyes were classified into junior, middle and senior. A senior podyachy (Старший подьячий) was a councillor to a dyak.

See also
See "Voyevoda#Siberia for their role in Siberian administration
See "Deacon#Cognates" for other historical terms derived from the Greek diakonos.

Government occupations
Obsolete occupations
Tsardom of Russia
Russian Empire